The National Shrine of the Sacred Heart of Jesus, popularly known as Iglesia del Cerrito (due to its location on top of the Cerrito de la Victoria) is a Roman Catholic parish church and national shrine in Montevideo, Uruguay.

Overview
The building is inspired in the Sacré-Cœur, Paris with some influences of Hagia Sophia, Constantinople; it bears a free interpretation of the Byzantine style, but built in brick. Its situation on top of the Cerrito hill makes it one of the most notable landmarks in the Montevidean cityscape.

This temple is a National Sanctuary since 1898, as established by Archbishop Mariano Soler. Later, the parish was established on 30 October 1919.

References

External links

Cerrito, Montevideo
1919 establishments in Uruguay
Roman Catholic church buildings in Montevideo
Roman Catholic churches completed in 1926
Byzantine Revival architecture in Uruguay
Roman Catholic shrines in Uruguay
20th-century Roman Catholic church buildings in Uruguay